Liam Patrick Davison (29 July 1957 – 17 July 2014) was an Australian novelist and reviewer. He was born in Melbourne, where, until 2007, he taught creative writing at the Chisholm Institute in Frankston.

Biography
Davison was educated at St Bede's College, Melbourne and Melbourne Teacher's College. He was awarded the National Book Council's Banjo Award for Fiction in 1993 and shortlisted for several literary prizes such as The Age Book of the Year Award and the Victorian Premier's Literary Award. His work has appeared in many Australian literary anthologies. He was an occasional reviewer for The Australian newspaper.

Davison and his wife Frankie, a teacher at Toorak College, were both killed on 17 July 2014 aboard Malaysia Airlines Flight 17, which was shot down over Ukraine.

Publications
The Velodrome (1988)
The Shipwreck Party (Short stories) (1989)
Soundings (1993)
The White Woman (1994)
The Betrayal (1999)
The Spirit of Australia (with Jim Conquest) (1999)
The Florilegium (2001)
Collected Stories (1999, 2001, 2003, 2011, 2012, 2013)

References

External links
Catalogue listing at the National Library of Australia

1957 births
2014 deaths
20th-century Australian novelists
20th-century Australian male writers
21st-century Australian novelists
Australian male novelists
Australian people murdered abroad
Malaysia Airlines Flight 17 victims
Writers from Melbourne
21st-century Australian male writers